Ge Fei (born 9 October 1975) is a Chinese former badminton player who is one of the most successful doubles specialists in the sport's history. Among many international titles, Ge won two Olympic gold medals and two IBF World Championship gold medals in the women's doubles with her regular partner Gu Jun and a World Championship gold medal in the mixed doubles with Liu Yong. Ge was also a member of Chinese teams that captured the Uber Cup (women's world team trophy) in 1998 and 2000. Ge and Gu Jun were the world's dominant women's doubles team from the mid-1990s to their retirement after the 2000 Olympics, winning over thirty top tier international titles together. Ge Fei was elected to the Hall of Fame in 2008.

She is married to the former World Champion singles badminton player Sun Jun.

Olympic Games
1996
Ge Fei competed in 1996 Olympics in the women's doubles together with Gu Jun. They won the gold medal beating Gil Young-ah and Jang Hye-ock from Korea 15–5, 15–5 in the final.

2000
Ge also competed in 2000 Olympics in women's doubles with Gu Jun and in mixed doubles together with Liu Yong. In the women's doubles Ge and Gu beat Huang Nanyan and Yang Wei from China 15–5, 15–5 in the final. In mixed doubles she and Liu were upset in round of 16 by Chris Bruil and Erica van den Heuvel from the Netherlands 15–17, 7–15.

Achievements

Olympic Games 
Women's doubles

World Championships 
Women's doubles

Mixed doubles

World Cup 
Women's doubles

Mixed doubles

Asian Games 
Women's doubles

Asian Championships 
Women's doubles

Mixed doubles

Asian Cup 
Women's doubles

Mixed doubles

World Junior Championships 
The Bimantara World Junior Championships was an international invitation badminton tournament for junior players. It was held in Jakarta, Indonesia from 1987 to 1991.

Girls' doubles

IBF World Grand Prix (46 titles, 11 runners-up)
The World Badminton Grand Prix sanctioned by International Badminton Federation (IBF) from 1983 to 2006.

Women's doubles

Mixed doubles

IBF International (4 titles)
Women's singles

Women's doubles

Mixed doubles

References

Sources

External links
 
 
 
 

1975 births
Living people
Sportspeople from Nantong
Badminton players from Jiangsu
Chinese female badminton players
Badminton players at the 1996 Summer Olympics
Badminton players at the 2000 Summer Olympics
Olympic badminton players of China
Olympic gold medalists for China
Olympic medalists in badminton
Medalists at the 1996 Summer Olympics
Medalists at the 2000 Summer Olympics
Badminton players at the 1994 Asian Games
Badminton players at the 1998 Asian Games
Asian Games medalists in badminton
Asian Games gold medalists for China
Asian Games bronze medalists for China
Medalists at the 1994 Asian Games
Medalists at the 1998 Asian Games
World No. 1 badminton players
Nanjing Sport Institute alumni
20th-century Chinese women
21st-century Chinese women